Kazım Karabekir Stadium is a multi-purpose stadium in Erzurum, Turkey. It is currently used mostly for football matches and is the home ground of Erzurumspor F.K. The stadium currently holds  21,374 people.

The name of the stadium was changed to Kazim Karabekir Stadium on August 10, 2012.

References

Football venues in Turkey
Kazim Karabekir
Multi-purpose stadiums in Turkey
Buildings and structures in Erzurum
Erzurumspor
Süper Lig venues